Pseudodyssynergia (or detrusor sphincter pseudodyssynergia) is an urological condition involving contraction of the male or female external sphincter during voiding.

Coordination between the sphincter and detrusor is thus lost.

See also 
 Prostatitis

References 

Urological conditions